Scissors are hand-operated shearing tools. A pair of scissors consists of a pair of metal blades pivoted so that the sharpened edges slide against each other when the handles (bows) opposite to the pivot are closed. Scissors are used for cutting various thin materials, such as paper, cardboard, metal foil, cloth, rope, and wire. A large variety of scissors and shears all exist for specialized purposes. Hair-cutting shears and kitchen shears are functionally equivalent to scissors, but the larger implements tend to be called shears. Hair-cutting shears have specific blade angles ideal for cutting hair. Using the incorrect type of scissors to cut hair will result in increased damage or split ends, or both, by breaking the hair. Kitchen shears, also known as kitchen scissors, are intended for cutting and trimming foods such as meats.

Inexpensive, mass-produced modern scissors are often designed ergonomically with composite thermoplastic and rubber handles.

Terminology
The noun scissors is treated as a plural noun, and therefore takes a plural verb (e.g., these scissors are). Alternatively, the tool is referred to by the singular phrase a pair of scissors. The word shears is used to describe similar instruments that are larger in size and for heavier cutting.

History

 

The earliest known scissors appeared in Mesopotamia 3,000 to 4,000 years ago. These were of the 'spring scissor' type comprising two bronze blades connected at the handles by a thin, flexible strip of curved bronze which served to hold the blades in alignment, to allow them to be squeezed together, and to pull them apart when released.

Spring scissors continued to be used in Europe until the 16th century.  However, pivoted scissors of bronze or iron, in which the blades were pivoted at a point between the tips and the handles, the direct ancestor of modern scissors, were invented by the Romans around 100 AD. They entered common use in not only ancient Rome, but also China, Japan, and Korea, and the idea is still used in almost all modern scissors.

Early manufacture
During the Middle Ages and Renaissance, spring scissors were made by heating a bar of iron or steel, then flattening and shaping its ends into blades on an anvil. The center of the bar was heated, bent to form the spring, then cooled and reheated to make it flexible.

The Hangzhou Zhang Xiaoquan Company in Hangzhou, China, has been manufacturing scissors since 1663.

William Whiteley & Sons (Sheffield) Ltd. was producing scissors by 1760, although it is believed the business began trading even earlier. The first trade-mark, 332, was granted in 1791. The company is still manufacturing scissors today, and is the oldest company in the West to do so.

Pivoted scissors were not manufactured in large numbers until 1761, when Robert Hinchliffe of Sheffield produced the first pair of modern-day scissors made of hardened and polished cast steel. His major challenge was to form the bows; first, he made them solid, then drilled a hole, and then filed away metal to make this large enough to admit the user's fingers. This process was laborious, and apparently Hinchliffe improved upon it in order to increase production. Hinchliffe lived in Cheney Square (now the site of Sheffield Town Hall), and set up a sign identifying himself as a "fine scissor manufacturer". He achieved strong sales in London and elsewhere.

During the 19th century, scissors were hand-forged with elaborately decorated handles. They were made by hammering steel on indented surfaces known as 'bosses' to form the blades. The rings in the handles, known as bows, were made by punching a hole in the steel and enlarging it with the pointed end of an anvil.

In 1649, in Swedish-ruled Finland, an ironworks was founded in the village of Fiskars between Helsinki and Turku. In 1830, a new owner started the first cutlery works in Finland, making, among other items, scissors with the Fiskars trademark.

Modern manufacturing regions

China

The vast majority of global scissor manufacturing takes place in China. As of 2019, China was responsible for 64.3% of worldwide scissors exports. When combined with Chinese Taipei exports, this rises to 68.3%. The primary scissors producing region in China is in Guandong Province.

The Hangzhou Zhang Xiaoquan Company, founded in 1663, is one of the oldest continuously operating scissor manufacturers in the world. The company was nationalized in 1958 and now employs 1500 people who annually mass-produce an estimated 7-million pairs of inexpensive scissors that retail for an average of US$4 each.

France

In the late 14th century the English word “scissors” came into usage. It was derived from the Old French word, “cisoires” which referred to shears.

There are several historically important scissor-producing regions in France: Haute-Marne in Nogent-en Bassigny, Châtellereault, Thiers and Rouen. These towns, like many other scissor-producing communities, began with sabre, sword and bayonet production, which transitioned to scissors and other blades in the late 18th and early 19th centuries.

Thiers, in the Puy-de-Dôme department of Auvergne, remains an important centre of scissor and cutlery production. It is home to both the Musée de la Coutellerie, which showcases the town’s 800 year history of blade-making, as well as Coutellia, an industry tradeshow that advertises itself as one of the largest annual gatherings of artisanal blade-makers in the world.

Germany

Germany was responsible for manufacturing just under 7% of global scissors exports in 2019. Often called “The City of Blades”, Solingen, in North Rhine-Westphalia, has been a center for the manufacturing of scissors since medieval times. At the end of the 18th century it’s estimated that there were over 300 scissorsmiths in Solingen.

In 1995 the City of Solingen passed The Solingen Ordinance, an update to a 1930s law that decreed “Made in Solingen” stamps could only be applied to products almost entirely manufactured in the old industrial area of Solingen. In 2019 this applied to approximately 150 companies making high-quality blades of all kinds, including scissors.

Freidrich Herder, founded in Solingen in 1727, is one of the oldest scissors manufacturers still operating in Germany.

Italy

Premana, in Lecco Province, has its origins in ironworks and knife manufacturing beginning in the 16th century. In 1900 there were ten scissor manufacturing workshops, 20 in 1952 and 48 by 1960. Today, Consorzio Premax, an industrial partnership, organizes over 60 local companies involved in the manufacture of scissors for global markets. In 2019 Italy exported 3.5% of scissors manufactured globally. 

One of the oldest Premanese scissor manufacturing firms still in operation is Sanelli Ambrogio, which was founded in 1869.

Japan

Scissormaking in Japan evolved from sword making in the 14th century. Seki, in Gifu Prefecture, was a renowned center of swordmaking beginning in the 1200s. After citizens were no longer permitted to carry swords, the city’s blacksmiths turned to making scissors and knives. There are many specialized types of Japanese scissors, but sewing scissors were introduced by American Commodore Matthew Perry from the United States in 1854.

The Sasuke workshop in Sakai City south of Osaka is run by Yasuhiro Hirakawa, a 5th generation scissorsmith. The company has been in operation since 1867. Yasuhiro Hirakawa is the last traditional scissormaker in Japan, making scissors in the traditional style where the blades are believed to be thinner, lighter and sharper than European scissors. In 2018 he was profiled in a documentary that featured a pair of his bonsai snips which retailed for $35,000 USD.

Spain

In Solsona, Spain, scissor manufacturing began in the 16th century. At the industry’s peak in the 18th century there were 24 workshops, organized as the Guild of Saint Eligius, the patron saint of knife makers. By the mid-1980s there were only two, and by 2021, Pallarès Solsona, founded in 1917 by Lluìs and Carles Pallarès Canal, and still family-operated, was the town’s sole remaining artisanal scissor manufacturer.

United Kingdom

Sheffield was home to the first mass production of scissors beginning in 1761. By the 19th century there were an estimated 60 steel scissor companies in Sheffield. However, since the 1980s, industry globalization and a shift towards cheaper, mass-produced scissors created price deflation that many artisanal manufacturers could not compete with. The Sheffield scissor industry consisted of just two local companies in 2021.

The two remaining Sheffield scissor manufacturers are William Whiteley, founded in 1760, and Ernest Wright, which was established in 1902. Both now focus on high-end/niche crafting of “products for life” rather than mass production. Between these two firms it is estimated that there are no more than ten “Putter-Togetherers” or “Putters” who are the master-trained craftspeople responsible for high quality Sheffield scissor assembly. In 2020, Ernest Wright was recognized with the Award for Endangered Crafts by the British Heritage Crafts Association.

Description and operation

A pair of scissors consists of two pivoted blades. In lower-quality scissors, the cutting edges are not particularly sharp; it is primarily the shearing action between the two blades that cuts the material. In high-quality scissors, the blades can be both extremely sharp, and tension sprung – to increase the cutting and shearing tension only at the exact point where the blades meet. The hand movement (pushing with the thumb, pulling with the fingers) can add to this tension. An ideal example is in high-quality tailor's scissors or shears, which need to be able to perfectly cut (and not simply tear apart) delicate cloths such as chiffon and silk.

Children's scissors are usually not particularly sharp, and the tips of the blades are often blunted or 'rounded' for safety.

Mechanically, scissors are a first-class double-lever with the pivot acting as the fulcrum. For cutting thick or heavy material, the mechanical advantage of a lever can be exploited by placing the material to be cut as close to the fulcrum as possible. For example, if the applied force (at the handles) is twice as far away from the fulcrum as the cutting location (i.e., the point of contact between the blades), the force at the cutting location is twice that of the applied force at the handles. Scissors cut material by applying at the cutting location a local shear stress which exceeds the material's shear strength.

Some scissors have an appendage, called a finger brace or finger tang, below the index finger hole for the middle finger to rest on to provide for better control and more power in precision cutting. A finger tang can be found on many quality scissors (including inexpensive ones) and especially on scissors for cutting hair (see hair scissors pictured below).  In hair cutting, some claim the ring finger is inserted where some place their index finger, and the little finger rests on the finger tang.

For people who do not have the use of their hands, there are specially designed foot-operated scissors. Some quadriplegics can use a motorized mouth-operated style of scissor.

Right-handed and left-handed scissors 

Most scissors are best suited for use with the right hand, but left-handed scissors are designed for use with the left hand. Because scissors have overlapping blades, they are not symmetric. This asymmetry is true regardless of the orientation and shape of the handles: the blade that is on top always forms the same diagonal regardless of orientation. Human hands are also asymmetric, and when closing, the thumb and fingers do not close vertically, but have a lateral component to the motion.  Specifically, the thumb pushes out from the palm and the fingers pull inwards. For right-handed scissors held in the right hand, the thumb blade is closer to the user's body, so that the natural tendency of the right hand is to force the cutting blades together.  Conversely, if right-handed scissors are held in the left hand, the natural tendency of the left hand would be to force the cutting blades laterally apart. Furthermore, with right-handed scissors held by the right hand, the shearing edge is visible, but when they are used with the left hand, the cutting edge of the scissors is behind the top blade, and one cannot see what is being cut.

There are two varieties of left-handed scissors. Many common left-handed scissors (often called “semi” left-handed scissors) simply have reversed finger grips. The blades open and close as with right-handed scissors, which forces users to pull the blades apart as they are cutting. This can be challenging for craftspeople as the blades still obscure the cut. “True” left-handed scissors have both reversed finger grips and a reversed blade connection; they are basically mirror images of right-handed scissors.  If someone is accustomed to using semi-left handed scissors they may find using true left handed scissors difficult at first as they may have learned to rely heavily on the strength of their thumb to pull the blades apart vs. pushing the blades together in order to cut.

Some scissors are marketed as ambidextrous. These have symmetric handles so there is no distinction between the thumb and finger handles, and have very strong pivots so that the blades simply rotate and do not have any lateral give. However, most "ambidextrous" scissors are in fact still right-handed in that the upper blade is on the right, and hence is on the outside when held in the right hand. Even if they cut successfully, the blade orientation will block the view of the cutting line for a left-handed person. True ambidextrous scissors are possible if the blades are double-edged and one handle is swung all the way around (to almost 360 degrees) so that the back of the blades become the new cutting edges.  has been awarded for true ambidextrous scissors.

Specialized scissors
Among specialized scissors and shears used for different purposes are:

Gardening, agriculture and animal husbandry

Food and drug

Grooming

Metalwork

Medical

Ceremonial

Sewing and clothes-making

In popular culture 
Due to their ubiquity across cultures and classes, scissors have numerous representations across world culture.

Art
Numerous art forms worldwide enlist scissors as a tool/material with which to accomplish the art. For cases where scissors appear in or are represented by the final art product, see Commons:Category:Scissors in art.

Film
Dead Again is a 1991 film starring Kenneth Branagh and Emma Thompson in a thriller revolving around repressed memories of scissors.
Edward Scissorhands is a 1990 film starring Johnny Depp as a young man who has hands made of multiple pairs of scissors.
Running with Scissors is a 2006 film based on the memoir of the same title.
Us is a 2019 psychological horror film directed by Jordan Peele about a family confronted by their scissor-wielding doppelgängers.

Games
 The game Rock paper scissors involves two or more players making shapes with their hands to determine the outcome of the game. One of the three shapes, 'scissors', is made by extending the index and middle fingers to mimic the shape of most scissors.

 In the horror video game franchise, Clock Tower, there is a character called Scissorman. Although the identity is usually taken by multiple individuals throughout the series, Scissorman is usually portrayed as a demonic serial killer with a giant pair of scissors, and kills anyone without showing any signs of mercy or remorse.

An anthropomorphic pair of scissors appears as a boss in Paper Mario: The Origami King. Various additions of scissor related activity appear as well, such as a variation of Rock paper scissors.

Literature
Heinrich Hoffmann's 1845 children's book Struwwelpeter includes Die Geschichte vom Daumenlutscher ("The Story of the Thumb-Sucker") in which a child continues to suck his thumbs despite his mother's warnings about The Great Tall Scissorman.

Augusten Burroughs' 2002 memoir Running with Scissors spent eight weeks on the New York Times best seller list. The book was later adapted into a film.

Music
Running with Scissors is the title of a 1999 album by "Weird Al" Yankovic.
The song "The Tailor Shop on Enbizaka (円尾坂の仕立屋 Enbizaka no Shitateya)" from Vocaloid producer Akuno-P tells a story about a tailor that kills a man and his family, whom she mistakes for her unfaithful lover and his three mistresses, using her sewing scissors.
The XTC song "Scissor Man", later covered by Primus.
"Save Your Scissors" – song by City and Colour.
The song "Scissors" by American Rock Band "Slipknot"

Sport
The term 'scissor kick' may be found in several sports, including:
Scissor kick (strike), a generic martial arts term for any of a number of moves that may resemble the appearance or action of a pair of scissors.
Bicycle kicks in football are sometimes known as 'scissor kicks'.
Swimming strokes including the sidestroke incorporate a leg movement often known as a 'scissor kick'.

Superstition
Scissors have a widespread place in cultural superstitions. In many cases, the details of the superstition may be specific to a given country, region, tribe, religion or even situation.
Africa
In parts of North Africa, it was held that scissors could be used to curse a bridegroom. When the bridegroom was on horseback, the person enacting the curse would stand behind him with the scissors open and call his name. If the bridegroom answered to his name being called, the scissors would then be snapped shut and the bridegroom would be unable to consummate his marriage with his bride.
Asia
In Pakistan, some believe that scissors should never be idly opened and closed without purpose; this is believed to cause bad luck.
Western Europe
As iron was believed to ward off fairies, British parents traditionally hung a pair of iron scissors over cradles to keep fairies away. Sometimes the scissors were kept open to make the shape of a cross for extra protection.
North America
United States
In New Orleans, some believed that putting an open pair of scissors underneath your pillow at night was a sound method for sleeping well, even if one is cursed.
Eastern Europe
In some Eastern European countries, it is believed that leaving scissors open causes fights and disagreements within a household.
China
In China, it is believed that to give scissors to a friend or loved one is to be cutting ties with them.

Science
Scissors have been used in the sciences for various purposes, including descriptions of animals or natural features.

Nature
Animals named after scissors include:
Birds
The scissor-tailed flycatcher of North and Central America.
The scissor-tailed hummingbird
The scissor-tailed kite, a bird that is widespread throughout Africa.
The scissor-tailed nightjar of South America.
Fish
The scissor-tail rasbora, several species of fish that are commonly used for freshwater aquariums.

Gallery

See also
Hemostat resembles a pair of scissors, but is used as a clamp in surgery and does not cut at all.
Nippers cut (break) small pieces out of tile.
Pliers used for holding and crimping metal or wire.
Tijeras Canyon a geological feature in New Mexico, USA and Tijeras a village in the same canyon, after "scissors" in Spanish.

References

External links 
 

 
Embroidery equipment
Mechanical hand tools
Sewing equipment